Bashterma (Baştirmä) is a rural locality (a village) in Yamakayevsky Selsoviet, Blagovarsky District, Bashkortostan, Russia. The population was 17 as of 2010. There is 1 street.

Geography 
Bashterma is located 20 km southeast of Yazykovo (the district's administrative centre) by road. Slak is the nearest rural locality.

References 

Rural localities in Blagovarsky District